Khao Chon Kai is a 2006 Thai teen comedy drama film directed by Withid Kamsrakeaw.

Plot

Khao Chon Kai is a military training camp where Thai boys will face the challenge of the training during their senior year of high school. A group of boys meet at the camp and begin their training together, encountering many obstacles during the rigorous training regimines. Despite the hardships, they discover that friendship and true friends are the most precious things they've found in Khao Chon Kai.

Cast
 Sorapong Chatree as Tai
 Wasit Phongsopa as Nhoi
 Apipon Treetewawongsa as Bob
 Aach Lhaisakul as Peun
 Ratchawin Wongviriya as Jib
 Thanapon Wikitset as Pualla

External links 
 

2006 films
Sahamongkol Film International films
Thai-language films
Thai teen films
2000s teen comedy-drama films
Thai comedy-drama films